CIO may refer to:

Organizations 
 Central Imagery Office, a predecessor of the American National Geospatial-Intelligence Agency
 Central Intelligence Office, the national intelligence agency of the former Republic of Vietnam
 Central Intelligence Organisation, the national intelligence agency of Zimbabwe
 Centro de Investigaciones en Optica, a Mexican research center in optics
 Charitable incorporated organisation, a form of legal entity for non-profits in the United Kingdom
 Congress of Industrial Organizations, a former American trade union federation (at first named the Committee of Industrial Organization)
Corruption Investigation Office for High-ranking Officials, a government agency of South Korea
 Credit and Investments Ombudsman, an Australian dispute resolution service
 International Olympic Committee (French: Comité International Olympique)

Titles 
 Chairman-in-Office, is an official of a member state holding the presidency of an international organization
 Chief information officer, the head of information technology
 Chief innovation officer, the head of innovation, responsible for innovation management
 Chief investment officer, the head of investments
 Commonwealth Chairperson-in-Office, the Chairperson-in-Office of the Commonwealth of Nations

Other uses 
 Charitable Incorporated Organisation, a legal form of business in the United Kingdom 
 CIO magazine, both print and online
 Concurrent input/output, a feature in the JFS file system
 Conventional International Origin, a conventionally defined reference axis of the pole's average location
 "Cry it out", an aspect of the Ferber method for solving childhood sleep problems
 City One station, Hong Kong, MTR station code

See also